Survival Sickness is the first studio album by the (International) Noise Conspiracy, released in 2000.

Critical reception
The Washington Post wrote that "even the Conspiracy's most energetic broadsides seem more well-meaning than incendiary." CMJ New Music Report called the album "astounding," and noted the "nearly flawless thematic progression as a call-to-arms." The Chicago Tribune called it "a truly volatile Molotov cocktail of '60s garage-rock and Stooges-style punk."

Track listing

References

Epitaph Records albums
The (International) Noise Conspiracy albums
Burning Heart Records albums
2000 albums